Caldas de Monchique is a spa town in the Monchique Mountains in the Algarve region of Portugal. It has been famous since Roman times for its waters, which supposedly have healing properties. It was also used as a seasonal retreat for Portuguese royalty. It has recently gained more international recognition, particularly for health tourism, but also for its landscape and architecture.

Gallery

Towns in Portugal
Spa towns in Portugal